İlkin Aydın (born January 5, 2000 in Ankara, Turkey) is a Turkish volleyball player. She plays for Galatasaray.

Career
On 5 August 2017, she signed a 3-year contract with the Galatasaray Women's Volleyball Team.

References

External links
Player profile at Galatasaray.org
Player profile at Volleybox.net
Player profile at Turkey Volleyball Federation

2000 births
Sportspeople from Ankara
Living people
Turkish women's volleyball players
Galatasaray S.K. (women's volleyball) players
İller Bankası volleyballers
21st-century Turkish sportswomen